Jesús "Chus" Alonso Fernández (April 24, 1917 in Havana – August 9, 1979 in Madrid), was a Spanish association football player. He played as a midfielder.

Club career
Alonso had moved to Spain at a young age, and played exclusively for Spanish clubs. He scored 2 goals in the inaugural game at  the Santiago Bernabéu Stadium, and also scored in the first competitive game in the stadium against Athletic Bilbao.

International career
Chus Alonso was born in Cuba to parents of Spanish descent. He was naturalized as Spanish, and he played 3 matches for Spain national football team, held with France, Germany and Italy.

Titles
Alsonso played 121 matches in La Liga for Real Madrid and scored 55 goals. He also played 39 matches in the Copa del Generalísimo, scoring 12 goals. His trophy collection includes two Spanish Cups and a Copa Eva Duarte.

See also
List of Spain international footballers born outside Spain

References

External links
 

1917 births
1979 deaths
Cuban emigrants to Spain
Real Madrid CF players
Spanish footballers
Spain international footballers
Real Zaragoza players
Real Valladolid players
Real Oviedo players
Association football midfielders
Cuban people of Spanish descent
Footballers from Asturias
Cuban sportspeople
La Liga players
Segunda División players